Look at My Butt Crack is the sixth comedy album by American stand-up comedian Kathy Griffin, recorded live on  in Las Vegas, Nevada at the Mirage.

Track listing

Personnel

Technical and production
 Kathy Griffin – Executive producer; performer

Visuals and imagery

References

External links
Kathy Griffin's official website

Kathy Griffin albums
Stand-up comedy albums
2014 live albums
2010s comedy albums
2010s spoken word albums
Spoken word albums by American artists
Live comedy albums
Albums recorded at the Mirage